is a Japanese Magic: The Gathering player. His success include four top eights at the Pro Tour level, and six on the Grand Prix level, including one win. He is ranked 12th on lifetime pro points.

Career
Tsuyoshi Ikeda began his Pro Tour career at Pro Tour New York in 1998. Over the next two seasons, he qualified for the occasional Pro Tour, but without much success. It wasn't until 2000 that Ikeda began to enjoy success in professional Magic. He finished fourth at Grand Prix Kuala Lumpur and played most of the Pro Tours that season. His success continued over the years that followed, with Ikeda making the top eight of one premier event each season from 2000-01 and 2005.

His breakout performance on the Pro Tour came at Pro Tour Yokohama in 2003. Ikeda made the top eight, and finished third, losing to countryman Masashi Oiso in the semifinals. The following season, Ikeda reached the finals of the team Pro Tour in Seattle. Alongside teammates Itaru Ishida and Jin Okomoto, Ikeda lost the finals to von Dutch, consisting of Jelger Wiegersma, Kamiel Cornelissen, and Jeroen Remie.

After 2005, Ikeda took a break from the game, only to come back in 2008 better than ever. After having top eighted two Grand Prix that season, Ikeda made his third Pro Tour top eight at the World Championship in Memphis, Tennessee. A semifinal loss to Jamie Parke saw him finish third.

Ikeda's renewed success continued through 2009. Ikeda won a premier level event for the first time that season at Grand Prix Niigata. To follow up on his win, Ikeda made another top eight at Pro Tour Austin. Like in Seattle five years earlier, Ikeda lost the finals again, this time to Brian Kibler.

Achievements

References

Year of birth missing (living people)
Living people
Japanese Magic: The Gathering players
Sportspeople from Fukuoka Prefecture